Vohidiala is a rural municipality in Madagascar. It belongs to the district of Ambatondrazaka, which is a part of Alaotra-Mangoro Region.

Transport
Vohidiala is a railway station on the Moramanga - Alaotra Lake line and is located at the RN 44 with its junction with RN 3A.

Religion
 FJKM - Fiangonan'i Jesoa Kristy eto Madagasikara (Church of Jesus Christ in Madagascar)

References and notes 

Populated places in Alaotra-Mangoro